Onuora Nzekwu also known as Joseph Onuora Nzekwu (19 February 1928 – 21 April 2017) was a Nigerian professor, writer and editor from the Igbo people. He is author of the 1961 novel Wand of Noble Wood and the 1963 novel Eze Goes to School which was among the African Writers Series.

Biography
Nzekwu was born in Kafanchan, Kaduna State, to Mr. Obiese Nzekwu and Mrs. Mary Ogugua Nzekwu (née Aghadiuno) of Onitsha in Anambra State. In January 1956, Nzekwu joined the Federal Civil Service and worked as an editorial assistant at the Nigeria Magazine division of the Federal Ministry of Information and Communications, from 1956 to 1958. In 1958, he took over the position of editor-in-chief of the magazine. Nzekwu continued to run the Nigeria Magazine division of the Federal Ministry of Information and Communications until 1966, when the Nigerian crisis compelled him to transfer his services to the Eastern Nigeria Public Service.

He began as a senior information officer at Eastern Nigeria, a post that combined the roles of Information Ministry and Cultural officer. In 1968, he was promoted deputy director of the newly created Cultural Division. At the end of hostilities in January 1970, Nzekwu returned to the Federal Ministry of Information in May and was assigned to the information division as senior information officer.

Nzekwu worked as general manager of News Agency of Nigeria (NAN) until 1 July 1979, when he then took over the position of substantive general manager. He retired from the Nigeria Public Service in 1985, after presiding over the affairs of NAN for nearly eight years and servicing his country’s government for 39 years.

Awards 
Onuora Nzekwu received the Rockefeller Foundation Fellowship in 1961, which enabled him to study American Methods of Magazine Production with Crafts Horizons in New York. In 1964, he was awarded a UNESCO Fellowship, which allowed him to study copyright administration for three months in Geneva, Prague, Paris, London, New York and Washington.

On 8 August 2006, News Agency of Nigeria observed its 30th anniversary during celebrations at Abuja. The NAN presented a plaque, with the engraving "Maker of NAN", to Nzekwu. In December 2008, Nzekwu was conferred with the Nigerian national honour of Officer of the Order of the Niger (OON).

Publications 
Nzekwu has also authored several novels. He co-authored Eze Goes to School and Eze Goes to College with historian Michael Crowder. The two school supplementary readers were first published by African University Press in 1964 and 1988 respectively.

In 1977, Nzekwu published his first non-fiction work, The Chima Dynasty in Onitsha, in which he presented the history of Onitsha through an account of the reign of its monarchs. Nzekwu's novel, Faith of Our Fathers, a compendium of the arts, beliefs, social institutions and code of values that characterize the Onitsha traditional community, was published in 2003.

Personal life 
Nzekwu married Onoenyi Justina Ogbenyeanu, daughter of Chief Isaac Aniegboka Mbanefo, Odu II of Onitsha, in June 1960 and was inducted into the ancient and prestigious Agbalanze Society of Onitsha in May 1991. He died on 21 April 2017.

Works
Wand of Noble Wood (1961)
Blade Among the Boys (1962)
Highlife for Lizards (1965)
Eze Goes to School (1966)
The Chima Dynasty in Onitsha (1977)
Faith Of Our Father's (2003)
Troubled Dust (2012)  
Ahmad Daggash (Story of the True)(2016)

References

Nzekwu, Onuora. (2006). In Encyclopædia Britannica.  Retrieved 20 August 2006, from Encyclopædia Britannica Premium Service: https://www.britannica.com/biography/Onuora-Nzekwu
 "Nigerians Don't Read as Expected - Onuora Nzekwu (Eze Goes to School Author)". Bivne's Space, 3 March 2012.

External links
Onuora Nzekwu at Encyclopædia Britannica

1928 births
2017 deaths
Igbo writers
Igbo educators
Nigerian writers
Officers of the Order of the Niger